The Industry and Parliament Trust (IPT) is a charity that works to promote the mutual understanding of Parliament and business. It works within the Parliament of the United Kingdom and organisations from all sectors of industry. It is non-partisan, non-lobbying and not-for-profit.

Its activities include:
 Fellowship programmes for Members of Parliament (MPs), peers and senior parliamentary staff. Fellowships provide the opportunity to gain hands-on experience at a variety of companies, spanning the various sectors through bespoke programmes of placements;
 Courses, seminars, panel discussions, lectures and events for policymakers, business people, academics, and civil servants;
A series of policy events echoing the most pertinent issues of the day being discussed in Parliament and business.
 MP attachments for civil servants. To see how MPs day-to-day decisions directly impacts the formulation of policy.

The Industry and Parliament Trust is based in Whitehall, London, close to the Houses of Parliament.

Fellowships 
A quarter of the current House of Commons are Fellows of the Industry and Parliament Trust. Fellowships are open to all MPs, peers, UK MEPs and senior House Staff irrespective of their political party. Most Fellowships consist of 18 days over 18 to 24 months, and all programmes are explicitly educational and non-lobbying, intended to give parliamentarians a greater understanding of the issues facing business and the British economy.

High-profile IPT Fellows include:
 The Rt Hon David Blunkett
 The Rt Hon Andrew Stunell OBE
 The Hon Ed Vaizey
 Tom Watson
 John Whittingdale OBE MP
Sir Peter Bottomley MP, Father of the House
Nick Thomas-Symonds MP, Shadow Home Secretary
The Rt Hon Baroness Morgan of Cotes
 The Rt Hon Baroness Fookes DBE DL
 The Rt Hon Baroness Jay of Paddington
 The Rt Hon Lord Martin of Springburn, former Speaker of the House of Commons (United Kingdom)
 The Rt Hon Baron Mawhinney
 The Rt Hon Lord McFall of Alcluith
 The Rt Hon Lord McNally PC
The Rt Hon Jacqui Smith, former Home Secretary

All Fellows receive a cartoon upon completion of their Fellowship, an original copy of which is retained at the British Cartoon Archive at the University of Kent.

Governance and secretariat
The IPT Board of Trustees includes seven MPs and three members of the House of Lords. It also includes representatives from business, legal and parliamentary clerks. The current chair of the trustees is Baroness Prosser and the Presidents are the Speaker of the House of Commons, The Rt Hon Sir Lindsay Hoyle MP and the Speaker of the House of Lords, The Lord Fowler Kt PC.

The Chief Executive is Nick Maher who began at the IPT in July 2011 having previously served in the Ministry of Defence on a team constructing a 'New Employment Model' for the Armed Forces. His predecessor was Sally Muggeridge, who served as Chief Executive for seven years.

The IPT employs eleven members of staff, all based in Whitehall, London.

History 
The IPT was founded in 1977 by the CEOs of 10 major British companies who sought to create dialogue between business and Parliament. It became a registered charity in 1983. The IPT has organised more than 600 Fellowship programmes since it was founded.

When the IPT was set up, just 15% of MPs had any direct business experience. Today that figure much higher, though needless to say there is still a substantial proportion of MPs without a comprehensive understanding of business.

In October 2009 the IPT commissioned a research project into the business experience of the Prospective Parliamentary Candidates (PPCs) who stood in the 2010 General Election. The research found that of the PPCs in winnable seats, less than half (48%) had any form of business management or financial services experience.

Related organisations 
The IPT has sister projects in Wales (Industry and National Assembly for Wales Association) and Northern Ireland (Northern Ireland Assembly and Business Trust). A Scottish project, the Scottish Parliament Business Exchange closed in 2016. New Zealand has its own version of the model, the NZ Business & Parliament Trust.

References

External links
 Industry and Parliament Trust

Non-profit organisations based in the United Kingdom